Omoyeni 'Yeni' Anikulapo-Kuti (also known as YK, born 24 May 1961, England, United Kingdom) is a dancer, singer and descendant of the Ransome-Kuti family. Her grandmother was Nigerian women's rights activist Funmilayo Ransome-Kuti. Anikulapo-Kuti pioneered the idea of Felabration, a music festival conceived to celebrate the life and contributions of her late father Fela Kuti to the Nigerian society.

Born in England, Anikulapo-Kuti was born as the first child to afrobeat pioneer Fela Kuti and to a British mother. She completed her basic and secondary education in Nigeria after leaving the United Kingdom at the age of two. She holds a diploma in journalism after she graduated from the Nigerian Institute of Journalism. In 1986, she joined Femi's band as a singer and dancer after dropping her job as a fashion designer. She currently serves as a co-manager of the New Afrika Shrine alongside her brother Femi Kuti.

References

External links

1961 births
Living people
20th-century Nigerian women singers
Ransome-Kuti family
English people of Yoruba descent
21st-century Nigerian women singers
Nigerian female dancers
Yoruba fashion designers
Nigerian women fashion designers